

Events 
 January–March 
 January 6 – The Committee of Inquiry on the collapse of the South Sea Company in Great Britain publishes its findings.
 February 5 – James Stanhope, chief minister of Great Britain, dies a day after collapsing while vigorously defending his government's conduct over the "South Sea Bubble" in Parliament.
 March 24 – Johann Sebastian Bach's Brandenburg concertos are completed, and dedicated to Christian Ludwig of Brandenburg-Schwedt.

 April–June 
 April 4 – Robert Walpole becomes the first Prime Minister of Great Britain (although this is more a term of disparagement at this time).
 April 21 – The deadliest outbreak of smallpox in the history of Boston begins when the British ship HMS Sea Horse arrives in Boston Harbor with a crew of sailors who had survived a smallpox epidemic.  One of the Seahorse crew who had cleared quarantine develops symptoms the next day and infects other people in a lodging house.  Over the next 10 months, 5,759 cases of smallpox are recorded in Boston and 844 people die of the disease.
 April 26 – Pirates John Taylor and Olivier Levasseur capture the 700-ton Portuguese galleon Nossa Senhora do Cabo at Réunion. The total value of treasure on board (from Goa) is estimated as between £100,000 and £875,000, one of the largest pirate hauls ever.    
 May 8 – Pope Innocent XIII succeeds Pope Clement XI, as the 244th pope.
 June 26 – Dr. Zabdiel Boylston of the Harvard University School of Medicine begins the first public inoculation campaign in order to slow the smallpox epidemic in Boston, giving a vaccine to his own son, and then to his slave and the slave's infant son.  

 July –September 
 July 31 – The Spanish expedition led by Coahuila Governor José de Azlor y Virto de Vera, sent to recapture Texas from the French, encounters Neches River the smaller French force of Louis Juchereau de St. Denis, who had led the French expansion westward from the Louisiana territory.  Realizing that his forces are badly outnumbered, St. Denis abandons hope of colonizing the east Texas territory and Azlor retakes the area.  
 August 18 – The Sack of Shamakhi occurs, in the Persian Safavid Empire.
 September 10 (August 23 Old Style) – The Treaty of Nystad is signed, ending the Great Northern War.

 October –December 
 October 22 – The Kelantan Sultanate is established at Kelantan Darul Naim (modern-day Kelantan Darul Naim, Malaysia).
 November 2  (October 22 Old Style) – The Romanov and architect of the Great Northern War Peter I, is proclaimed the first Emperor of All the Russias. This replaces the 174-year-long Tsardom of Russia with the Russian Empire (it collapses in 1917).
 December 22 – Philip V of Spain signs  a Royal Decree in Lerma, transforming the Seminary of Saint Rose of Lima in Caracas into the Universidad Real y Pontificia de Caracas.

 Date unknown 
 José de Azlor y Virto de Vera, Marquis of San Miguel de Aguayo and governor of Spanish Texas, establishes the fort of Presidio La Bahía at its original location, on the ruins of the failed French Fort Saint Louis.
 Regular mail service between London and New England is established.
 A suggestion box is developed under the eighth shōgun of Japan, Yoshimune Tokugawa.

Births 
 January 10 – Johann Philipp Baratier, German scholar (d. 1740)
 January 11 – Anna Magdalena Godiche, Danish book printer and publisher (d. 1781) 
 January 17 – Countess Palatine Elisabeth Auguste of Sulzbach, politically active Electress of Bavaria (d. 1794)
 February 3 – Friedrich Wilhelm von Seydlitz, Prussian general (d. 1773)
 February 8 – Catharina Elisabet Grubb, Finnish industrialist (d. 1788) 
 February 21 – John McKinly, American physician, President of Delaware (d. 1796)
 March 8 – Elizabeth Pierrepont, Duchess of Kingston-upon-Hull, English noble (d. 1788) 
 March 9 – Countess Palatine Caroline of Zweibrücken (d. 1774)
 March 19 – Tobias Smollett, Scottish physician and author (d. 1771)
 April 11 – David Zeisberger, Moravian missionary (d. 1808)
 April 14 – John Hanson, President of the Continental Congress of America (d. 1783)
 April 15 – Prince William Augustus, Duke of Cumberland, English military leader (d.  1765)

 April 19 – Roger Sherman, signer of the United States Declaration of Independence (d.  1793)
 June 19 – Johann de Kalb, Bavarian-French military officer who served as a major general in the Continental Army during the American Revolutionary War (d. 1780)
 July 9 – Johann Nikolaus Götz, German poet (d. 1781)
 July 14 – John Douglas, Scottish Anglican bishop and man of letters (d. 1807)
 August 4 – Granville Leveson-Gower, 1st Marquess of Stafford, English politician (d. 1803)
 August 31 – George Hervey, 2nd Earl of Bristol, British statesman (d. 1775)
 September 10 – Peyton Randolph, 1st and 3rd President of the Continental Congress (d. 1775)
 September 14 – Eliphalet Dyer, American statesman and judge (d. 1807)
 October 19 – Joseph de Guignes, French orientalist (d. 1800)
 November 9 – Mark Akenside, English poet and physician (d. 1770)
 November 22 – Joseph Frederick Wallet DesBarres, Swiss-born cartographer and Canadian statesman (d. 1824)
 December 6 
 James Elphinston, Scottish philologist (d. 1809)
 Guillaume-Chrétien de Lamoignon de Malesherbes, French statesman (d.  1794)
 December 27 – François Hemsterhuis, Dutch philosopher (d. 1790)
 December 29 – Madame de Pompadour, mistress of King Louis XV of France (d.  1764)
 Date unknown - Im Yunjidang, Korean scholar, writer and neo-Confucian philosopher (d.  1793)

Deaths 
 January 25 – Robert Challe, French colonialist (b. 1659)
 January 26 – Pierre Daniel Huet, French churchman and scholar (b. 1630)
 February 5 – Abraham Hill, British merchant (b. 1633)
 February 5 –James Stanhope, 1st Earl Stanhope, English chief minister (b. 1673)
 February 16 – James Craggs the Younger, English politician (b. 1686)
 February 24 – John Sheffield, 1st Duke of Buckingham and Normanby, English statesman and poet (b. 1648)
 March 16 – James Craggs the Elder, English politician (b. 1657)
 March 19 – Pope Clement XI (b. 1649)
 March 29 – Charles Vane, English pirate, executed (b. 1680)
 April 14 – Michel Chamillart, French statesman (b. 1652)
 April 27 – Eva von Buttlar, German mystic sectarian (b. 1670) 
 April 28 – Mary Read, English-born pirate (b. c. 1695)
 May 7 – Zinat-un-Nissa, princess of the Mughal Empire (b. 1643)
 May 8 – Marc-René de Voyer de Paulmy d'Argenson (1652–1721), French politician (b. 1652)
 May 10 – Christian William I, Prince of Schwarzburg-Sondershausen (1666–1720) (b. 1647)
 June 3 – Joaquín Canaves, Spanish Catholic bishop (b. 1640)
 June 18 – Philip, Landgrave of Hesse-Philippsthal, son of William VI (b. 1655)
 July 8 – Elihu Yale, American benefactor of Yale University (b. 1649)
 July 18 – Jean-Antoine Watteau, French painter (b. 1684)
 July 19 – Sir Jonathan Trelawny, 3rd Baronet, British bishop (b. 1650)
 July 26 – Godefroy Maurice de La Tour d'Auvergne, Duke of Bouillon, French noble (b. 1636)
 August 3 – Grinling Gibbons, Dutch-born woodcarver (b. 1648)
 August 13 – Jacques Lelong, French bibliographer (b. 1665)
 September 3 – Sir William Glynne, 2nd Baronet, English politician (b. 1663)
 September 6 – Georg Wolfgang Wedel, German physician, surgeon, botanist, chemist and philosopher (b. 1645)
 September 8
 Michael Brokoff, Czech sculptor (b. 1686)
 Henri Arnaud, French Waldensian pastor, leader (b. 1641)
 September 9 – David Martin, French theologian (b. 1639)
 September 11 – Rudolf Jakob Camerarius, German botanist and physician (b. 1665)

 September 17 – Marguerite Louise d'Orléans, French princess (b. 1645)
 September 18 – Matthew Prior, British poet and diplomat (b. 1664)
 September 20 – Thomas Doggett, Irish actor (b. c. 1670)
 September 24 – Pacificus of San Severino, Italian saint (b. 1653)
 October 4 – Abraham Alewijn, Dutch playwright (b. 1664)
 October 11 
 Edward Colston, English merchant, philanthropist (b. 1636)
 Anton Florian, Prince of Liechtenstein (b. 1656)
 October 23 – Samuel Frisching, Bernese soldier and politician (b. 1638)
 October 24 – Anthony Morris (I), American politician (b. 1654)
 December 13 – Alexander Selkirk, Scottish sailor (original "Robinson Crusoe") (b. 1676)

 December 17 – Richard Lumley, 1st Earl of Scarbrough, English statesman (b. 1650)
 December 25 – António Luís de Sousa, 2nd Marquis of Minas, Portuguese general, governor-general of Brazil (b. 1644)
 date unknown – Sultan Abdullah Khan Abdali, Persian Governor, Shah of Herat (b. 1670)

References